Mixed martial arts (MMA) has developed in Australia from a wide cross-section of sporting and martial arts disciplines to become the most popular combat sport in Australia.

History
The influence traditional martial arts, Olympic wrestling and Brazilian jiu-jitsu have shaped MMA in Australia, along with the combat sports of Boxing and Kickboxing/Muay Thai.

Between 1905-1914, Australian's witnessed a prizefighting novelty called "All-in" which started with "jiu jitsu" demonstrations and developed into a no-holds barred fighting phenomenon. One of the most notable participants was Sam McVea, an African-American heavyweight boxing champion who would participate in a highly publicised "all-in" fight in Lismore, Australia, against 'Prof.' Stevenson in 1913.

However, the early hybrid didn't last and during most of the 20th century traditional martial arts schools and striking based gyms existed apart as with Amateur wrestling in Australia. Traditional martial arts in general are well attended and feature in the top ten organised sports for children, for both males and females, in Australia.

In the 1990s the three grappling disciplines of BJJ, amateur wrestling and Catch wrestling provided the base for the modern sport. Mixed Martial Arts, in its recognized and regulated form, came to Australia via the Ultimate Fighting Championship's emergence in 1993, but was predated by Vale tudo in Brasil and Shoot wrestling in Japan. MMA gained an underground following through video and bootleg copies of UFC events in the mid 1990s.

The explosion of BJJ globally, through Gracie BJJ schools, was assisted by the success of Royce Gracie at UFC 1-4, but BJJ was first introduced into Australia by John Will in 1989. Initially dedicated Australian practitioners travelled overseas to gain their belts and returned to start schools. Mixed Martial Arts training and gyms began to evolve.

The long history of boxing and the more recent variant of kickboxing/Muay Thai in Australia provided a large injection of fighters with a striking base. The sport of MMA has been described as the fastest growing sport in the twenty first century.

Sanctioning
States and territories of Australia there are different sanctioning bodies and rules. Sanctioning bodies include: Combat Sports Authority (NSW), Professional Boxing and Combat Sports Board (VC) and Combat Sports Commission of Western Australia (WA).

Notable fighters (1990s to present)

 Alex Chambers - UFC
 Alexander Volkanovski - UFC
 Anthony Perosh - UFC
 Arlene Blencowe - Bellator
 Ashkan Mokhtarian - UFC
 Bec Rawlings - Bellator
 Chris Haseman - UFC
 Damien Brown - UFC
 Dan Kelly - UFC
 Elvis Sinosic - UFC
 George Sotiropoulos - UFC
 Jake Matthews - UFC
 Jessica-Rose Clark - UFC
 Jimmy Crute - UFC
 Justin Tafa - UFC
 Nadia Kassem - UFC
 Mark Hunt - UFC
 Megan Anderson - UFC
 Peter Graham - Bellator
 Robert Whittaker - UFC
 Soa Palelei - UFC
 Tai Tuivasa - UFC
 Tyson Pedro - UFC
 Callan Potter - UFC

Promotions

Ultimate Fighting Championship

 UFC 110 (2010) - Sydney
 UFC 127 (2011) - Sydney
 UFC on FX: Alves vs. Kampmann (2012) - Sydney
 UFC on FX: Sotiropoulos vs. Pearson (2012) - Gold Coast
 UFC Fight Night: Hunt vs. Bigfoot (2013) - Brisbane
 UFC Fight Night: Bisping vs. Rockhold (2014) - Sydney
 UFC Fight Night: Miocic vs. Hunt (2015) - Adelaide
 UFC 193: Rousey vs. Holm (2015) - Melbourne
 UFC Fight Night: Hunt vs. Mir (2016)  - Brisbane
 UFC Fight Night: Whittaker vs. Brunson (2016) - Melbourne
 UFC Fight Night: Werdum vs. Tybura (2017) - Sydney
 UFC 221 (2018) - Perth
 UFC Fight Night 142 (2018) - Adelaide
 UFC 234 (2019) - Melbourne
 UFC 243 (2019) - Melbourne
 UFC 284 (2023) - Perth

Local MMA Promotions
 Aftershock MMA - Brisbane, Queensland - Professional and Amateur Fight Promotion
 Australian Fighting Championship - Melbourne, Victoria
 BRACE 
 Carnage in the Cage (CITC) - Mackay, Queensland, Australia 
 Coastal Combat - Sunshine Coast, Queensland
 Eternal MMA - Gold Coast, Queensland
 Fightworld Cup - Gold Coast, Queensland
 HAMMA Fight Night - Brisbane, Queensland
 Hex Fight Series - Melbourne, VIC
 Minotaur Mixed Martial Arts (Melbourne Fight Club) - Melbourne
 Nitro MMA
 Storm Damage - Australian Capital Territory
 Superfight MMA (Superfight Australia) aka (Mach1FightClub) - New South Wales
 Unarmed Combat Unleashed (UCU) - Emerald, Queensland
 Urban Fight Night - Liverpool, New South Wales
 Wollongong Wars (WW) - Wollongong
 XFC - Australian and New Zealand professional and amateur
 Xtreme Impact Fighting Championships (XIFC) - Toowoomba, Queensland

Past
 Cage Fighting Championship (CFC) 2007-2012
 TUFFA MMA 2009-2011
 Impact Fighting Championships (2010)
 Xtreme MMA (XMMA) 2009-2010

Amateur MMA Organizations 
Some may have one or two pro fights but their focus is on AMMY.
 Amateur Cage Fighting Australia (ACFA) - Gold Coast, Queensland, Australia
 International Mixed Martial Arts Federation of Australia

Reality television
 The Ultimate Fighter: The Smashes
 Wimp 2 Warrior
 The Ultimate Fighter Nations: Canada vs. Australia

Gyms

some mixed martial arts training camps and gyms.
Gamebred Academy - Brisbane, Queensland
Fightcross MMA - Brisbane, Queensland
Absolute MMA
Australian Elite Team
Australian Top Team - Sydney, New South Wales
Bulldog MMA Parramatta
Igor MMA Sydney
Dominance MMA - Melbourne, Victoria
ELEV8 MMA - Melbourne, Victoria
Extreme MMA - Melbourne, Victoria
Hammers Gym
KMA Top Team - Sydney, New South Wales
Integrated MMA - Brisbane, Queensland
Kings Academy of Martial Arts
Riddlers Gym - Perth, Western Australia
Sinosic Perosh Martial Arts
VT1 Mixed Martial Arts Academy - Sydney, New South Wales
99ers MMA Gym
Kumiai Ryu Martial Arts
Langes Mixed Martial Arts - Sydney, New South Wales
Perth Kickboxing Academy
Blue Mountains Martial Arts Centre
Westside MMA - Caroline Springs, Victoria
The MMA Clinic - Perth, Western Australia
Scrappy MMA - Perth, Western Australia

Media outlets
Fight News Australia
Submission Radio

References